USS LST/LST(H)-482/Branch County (LST-482) was an  built for the United States Navy during World War II. Later renamed for Branch County, Michigan, she was the only US Naval vessel to bear the name.

Construction
LST-482 was laid down on 14 September 1942, under Maritime Commission (MARCOM) contract, MC hull 1002, by Kaiser Shipyards, Yard No. 4, Richmond, California; launched on 17 December 1942; and commissioned on 20 March 1943.

Service history
During World War II, LST-482 was assigned to the Asiatic-Pacific Theater and participated in the following operations: the Gilbert Islands operation in November and December 1943; the Occupation of Kwajalein and Majuro Atolls in January and February 1944; the Battle of Hollandia April 1944; the Battle of Guam July 1944; the Battle of Leyte landings October 1944; and the Lingayen Gulf landings January 1945.

Post-war service
Following the war, LST-482 was redesignated LST(H)-482 on 15 September 1945. She performed occupation duty in the Far East in November and December 1945. Upon her return to the United States, she was decommissioned on 23 February 1946 and redesignated LST-482 on 6 March 1952. The tank landing ship was subsequently renamed USS Branch County (LST-482) on 1 July 1955. Her name was struck from the Naval Vessel Register on 11 August 1955. In early March, 1956 the ship was sunk by naval gunfire and submarine-launched torpedoes in an exercise off San Diego, California.

Awards 
LST-482 earned six battle stars for World War II service.

Notes 

Citations

Bibliography 

Online resources

External links

LST-1-class tank landing ships of the United States Navy
Ships built in Richmond, California
1942 ships
World War II amphibious warfare vessels of the United States
Branch County, Michigan
S3-M2-K2 ships